Miriam Cooke (she spells her name in lowercase) is an American academic in Middle Eastern and Arab world studies. She focuses on modern Arabic literature and critical reassessment of women's roles in the public sphere. She was educated in the United Kingdom, and is co-editor of the Journal of Middle East Women's Studies.

She is a professor of modern Arabic literature and culture at Duke University. She received her doctorate from the St Antony's College, Oxford in 1980.

Bibliography

Fiction

References

External links

 Miriam Cooke Papers - Pembroke Center Archives, Brown University

Year of birth missing (living people)
Living people
American feminist writers
Historians of Arabic literature
Duke University faculty
Place of birth missing (living people)
Islamic feminism